The Silent Circle Instant Message Protocol (SCIMP) was an encryption scheme that was developed by Vincent Moscaritolo of Silent Circle. It enabled private conversation over instant message transports such as XMPP (Jabber).

SCIMP provided encryption, perfect forward secrecy and message authentication. It also handled negotiating the shared secret keys.

History
Silent Circle used SCIMP in their encrypted instant messaging application called Silent Text. Silent Text was discontinued on September 28, 2015, when its features were merged into Silent Circle's encrypted voice calling application called Silent Phone. At the same time, Silent Circle transitioned to using a protocol that uses the Double Ratchet Algorithm instead of SCIMP.

References

Cryptographic protocols